The Abraham Browne House (built c. 1694–1701) is a colonial house located at 562 Main Street, Watertown, Massachusetts, US. It is now a nonprofit museum operated by Historic New England and open to the public two afternoons per year.

The house was originally a modest one-over-one dwelling. The house features steep roofing and casement windows. During restoration works in 1919, details of 17th century finish were found. The ground floor consists of one large room that is used for living, cooking, and sleeping.

By 1919 the house was nearly ruined when it was acquired by William Sumner Appleton, who in 1923 donated it to Historic New England. The house has grown by a series of enlargements but they occurred behind the original block, thus preserving the profile of the one-over-one elevation. The exception, a 19th-century addition, was removed before 1919. The Browne House is one of fewer than a half-dozen houses in New England to retain this profile.

The Abraham Browne house was featured on PBS's This Old House television program.

See also 
 List of historic houses in Massachusetts
 List of the oldest buildings in Massachusetts
 National Register of Historic Places listings in Middlesex County, Massachusetts

References

External links

 Browne House – Historic New England

Houses completed in 1701
Historic house museums in Massachusetts
Houses on the National Register of Historic Places in Middlesex County, Massachusetts
Museums in Middlesex County, Massachusetts
Buildings and structures in Watertown, Massachusetts
Historic New England
1701 establishments in Massachusetts